Most winners, with some exceptions, have not attended the Golden Raspberry Awards ceremony or personally accepted their award, given that the "Razzies" single out the worst films of the year. According to Razzies tradition, the ceremony precedes the corresponding Academy Award function by one day.

In 1988, comedian Bill Cosby became the first to accept an award; he received his award for Leonard Part 6 on a late-night show on Fox. Director Paul Verhoeven became the first recipient to claim an award in person, when he accepted both the Worst Picture and Worst Director awards for his film Showgirls (1995). J. David Shapiro is the only winner to have received awards in person twice, though both wins were for the same film, Battlefield Earth, and only once in the actual ceremony.

List

See also

 John J. B. Wilson
 The Official Razzie Movie Guide

References

External links
 Golden Raspberry Official Website
 Razzie Awards page on the Internet Movie Database

Golden Raspberry Awards
Golden Raspberry Awards